The Pink Ribbon was a pro–am snooker tournament held at The Capital Venue in Gloucester, England. Established in 2010, the tournament raised funds for breast cancer charities and had the players all wear pink shirts to show their support. Stuart Bingham was the final champion.

The Capital Venue closed down in 2019. The tournament has not been held since.

Winners

See also
 Kay Suzanne Memorial Cup

References

Snooker pro–am competitions
Recurring sporting events established in 2010
Snooker competitions in England
Sport in Gloucester